The 2008 Billboard Latin Music Awards, produced and broadcast live on Telemundo, was held on Thursday, April 10, 2008. The award show aired on Telemundo at 7pm EST.

The following list is the 2008 Billboard Latin Music Award Nominees and Winners (Winners are in bold)

Host
 Aylín Mújica
 Alan Tacher

Performers
 Ricardo Montaner, Olga Tañón, Noel Schajris, Yuridia, Diana Reyes, Víctor Manuelle - Opening Act All Together
 Enrique Iglesias - (Sang Donde Estan Corazon & Dimelo)
 Conjunto Primavera
 Juan Luis Guerra - (Sang Como Yo)
 Kany García, Belanova,& Fanny Lu - (Kany García sang 'Hoy Ya Me Voy') (Fanny Lu Sang Y Si Te Digo)
 Alejandro Fernández
 Aventura - (Sang Los Infieles y Mi Corazoncito)
 Marco Antonio Solís
 Camila with Alexis & Fido - (Sang Yo Quiero)
 A.B. Quintanilla & Kumbia All Starz with Melissa Jiménez from Universal Studios Hollywood, Ca - (Sang Rica Y Apretadita)
 Juanes - (Sang Gotas De Agua Dulce)
 La Arrolladora Banda El Limón & Alacranes Musical
 Wisin & Yandel - (Sang Ahora Es)
 Lucero (tribute to José Alfredo Jiménez)
 Chayanne - (Sang Lola) Closing Act

Special awards

Lifetime achievement award

Conjunto Primavera

Spirit of Hope Award

Juanes

Your World Award (Premio Tu Mundo)

RBD

Hot Latin Songs of the Year

Hot Latin Song of the Year

"Mi Corazoncito" - Aventura
"No Te Veo" - Casa de Leones
"Dimelo" - Enrique Iglesias
"Me Enamora" - Juanes

Vocal Duet or Collaboration

"Impacto" - Daddy Yankee featuring Fergie
"Te Lo Agradezco, Pero No" - Alejandro Sanz featuring Shakira
"Siente El Boom" - Tito El Bambino featuring Randy
"Pegao" - Wisin & Yandel featuring Los Vaqueros

Artist of the Year

Juan Luis Guerra Y 440
Enrique Iglesias
Maná
Wisin & Yandel

Latin Pop Albums

Latin Album of the Year

(New Category)
"Todo Cambió" - Camila
"El Cartel: The Big Boss" - Daddy Yankee
"Como Ama Una Mujer" - Jennifer Lopez
"Wisin vs. Yandel: Los Extraterrestres" - Wisin & Yandel

Male

"Quien Dijo Ayer" - Ricardo Arjona
"Papito" - Miguel Bosé
"Viento A Favor" A- Alejandro Fernández
"La Vida... Es un Ratico" - Juanes

Female

"Como Ama Una Mujer" - Jennifer Lopez
"Demasiado Fuerte" - Yolandita Monge
"Real" - Ednita Nazario
"Habla El Corazón" - Yuridia

Duo or Group

"Todo Cambió" - Camila
"Pasajero" - Gypsy Kings
"Empezar Desde Cero" - RBD
"Pasado" - Sin Bandera

New Artist

"No Hay Espacio" - Black Guayaba
"Cualquier Dia" - Kany García
"Con Mi Soledad" - Juan
"Kingcallero Del Amor" - Gustavo Laureano

Top Latin Albums Artist of the Year

Aventura
Valentín Elizalde
Vicente Fernández
Marco Antonio Solís

Latin Rock/Alternative Album of the Year

"Fantasía Pop" - Belanova
"No Hay Espacio" - Black Guayaba
"Sí No" - Café Tacuba
"La Radiolina" - Manu Chao

Tropical Album of the Year

Male

"El Cantante" - Marc Anthony
"Una Navidad A Mi Estilo" - Víctor Manuelle
"Canciones Clasicas De Marco Antonio Solís" - Tito Nieves
"Contraste" - Gilberto Santa Rosa

Female

"90 Millas" - Gloria Estefan
"Lagrimas Calidas" - Fanny Lu
"Exitos En 2 Tiempo

Duo Or Group

"Kings of Bachata: Sold Out at Madison Square Garden" - Aventura
"La Llave de Mi Corazón" - Juan Luis Guerra Y 440
"Los 4 Fantasticos" - Karis
"United We Swing" - Spanish Harlem Orchestra

New Artist

"En Primera Plana" - Isaac Delgado
"Mi Parranda" - Andrés Jiménez: El Jibaro
"Lagrimas Calidas" - Fanny Lu

Regional Mexican Album of the Year

Male Solo Artist

"El Indomable" - Cristian Castro
"Te Va A Gustar" - El Chapo de Sinaloa
"Lobo Domesticado" - Valentín Elizalde
"Para Siempre" - Vicente Fernández

Male Duo or Group

"Ahora Y Siempre" - Alacranes Musical
"Recio, Recio Mis Creadorez" - Los Creadorez Del Pasito Duraguense De Alfredo Ramirez
"Agarrese" - Grupo Montéz de Durango
"Capaz de Todo Por Tí" - K-Paz de la Sierra

Female Group or Female Solo Artist

"Promesas No" - Graciela Beltrán
"Te Voy A Mostrar" - Diana Reyes
"La Diva En Vivo" - Jenni Rivera
"Mi Vida Loca" - Jenni Rivera

New Artist

"Con Los Ojos Cerrados" - Aliados De La Sierra
"Recio, Recio Mis Creadorez" - Los Creadorez Del Pasito Duraguense De Alfredo Ramirez
"El Regreso De Los Reyes" - Cruz Martínez Presenta Los Super Reyes
"Voy A Convecerte" - Los Primos De Durango

Latin Pop Airplay Song of the Year

Male

"Si Nos Quedara Poco Tiempo" - Chayanne
"Te Voy A Perder" - Alejandro Fernández
"Dimelo" - Enrique Iglesias
"Me Enamora" - Juanes

Female

"Hoy Ya Me Voy" - Kany García
"Que Hiciste" - Jennifer Lopez
"Eres Para Mi" - Julieta Venegas
"Como Yo Nadie Te Ha Hamado" - Yuridia

Duo or Group

"Me Muero" - La 5ª Estación
"Todo Cambio" - Camila
"Bendita Tu Luz" - Maná featuring Juan Luis Guerra
"Ojalá Pudiera Borrarte" - Maná

New Artist

"Ayer" - Black Guayaba
"Hoy Ya Me Voy" - Kany García
"Que Nos Paso" - Kany García
"Enamorado" - Gustavo Laureano

Tropical Airplay Song of the Year

Male

"Mi Gente" - Marc Anthony
"Dime Que Falto" - Zacarias Ferreira
"Mas Que Tu Amigo" - Tito Nieves
"En El Amor" - Joe Veras

Female

"No Llores" - Gloria Estefan
"No Te Pido Flores" - Fanny Lu
"Y Si Te Digo" - Fanny Lu
"Flaca O Gordita" - Olga Tañón

Duo or Group

"Mi Corazoncito" - Aventura
"La Llave de Mi Corazón" - Juan Luis Guerra Y 440
"Que Me Des Tu Cariño" - Juan Luis Guerra Y 440
"La Travesía" - Juan Luis Guerra Y 440

New Artist

"Me Voy" - Hector Acosta
"Quizas" - Tony Dize
"No Te Pido Flores" - Fanny Lu
"Y Si Te Digo" - Fanny Lu

Regional Mexican Airplay Song of the Year

Male Solo Artist

"A Ti Si Puedo Decirte" - El Chapo de Sinaloa
"Estos Celos" - Vicente Fernández
"Chuy Y Mauricio" - El Potro De Sinaloa
"Eso Y Mas" - Joan Sebastian

Male Group

"Por Amarte Así" - Alacranes Musical
"De Ti Exclusivo" - La Arrolladora Banda El Limón
"Mil Heridas" - Cuisillos
"Lagrimas Del Corazon" - Grupo Montéz de Durango

Female Group Or Female Solo Artist

"Es Cosa De El" - Graciela Beltrán
"Como Te Va Mi Amor" - Los Horóscopos de Durango
"Ahora Que Estuviste Lejos" - Jenni Rivera
"Mirame" - Jenni Rivera

New Artist

"Cada Vez Que Pienso En Ti" - Los Creadorez Del Pasito Duraguense De Alfredo Ramirez
"Te Pido Que Te Quedes" - Los Creadorez Del Pasito Duraguense De Alfredo Ramirez
"Tal Vez" - Los Primos De Durango
"Paz En Este Amor" - Fidel Rueda

Latin Tour of the Year

Vicente Fernández
Maná
Ricky Martin
RBD

Reggaeton

Album of the Year

"El Cartel: The Big Boss" - Daddy Yankee
"Sentimiento" - Ivy Queen
"Wisin vs. Yandel: Los Extraterrestres" - Wisin & Yandel
"The Perfect Melody" - Zion

Song of the Year

"No Te Veo" - Casa de Leones
"Ayer La Vi" - Don Omar
"Sola" - Hector El Father
"Igual Que Ayer" - R.K.M & Ken-Y

Other Latin

Latin Ringtone of the Year

"Caballo Prieto Azabache" - Antonio Aguilar
"Te Quise Olvidar" - Grupo Montéz de Durango
"Me Matas" - R.K.M & Ken-Y
"Hips Don't Lie" - Shakira featuring Wyclef Jean

Latin Ringmaster of the Year

(New Category)
"Mi Corazoncito" - Aventura
"Lean Like A Cholo" - Down AKA Kilo
"Me Enamora" - Juanes
"Si Dios Fuera Ilegal" - Los Rehenes

Latin Dance Club Play Track of the Year

"Whine Up" - Kat DeLuna featuring Elephant Man
"Do You Know? (The Ping Pong Song)/Dimelo" - Enrique Iglesias
"Que Lloren" - Ivy Queen
"Qué Hiciste" - Jennifer Lopez

Latin Rap/Hip-Hop Album of the Year

"Atrevete" - Jae-P
"Encuentros Musicales" - Jae-P/Kinto Sol
"15 Rayos" - Kinto Sol
"Los Hijos Del Maiz" - Kinto Sol

Latin Greatest Hits Album of the Year

"La Historia…Lo Mas Chulo, Chulo, Chulo" - Los Caminantes
"Historia De Un Idolo, Vol. 1 (Special Edition)" - Vicente Fernández
"La Historia Continua…Parte III" - Marco Antonio Solís
"La Mejor…Coleccion" - Marco Antonio Solís

Latin Compilation Album of the Year

"30 Bachatas Pegaditas: Lo Nuevo Y Lo Mejor De 2007" - Various Artists
"Bachata #1's" - Various Artists
"Now Latino 3" - Various Artists
"Top Latino V3" - Various Artists

Latin Jazz Album of the Year

"Hi-Lo Split" - Marc Antione
"Raise Your Hand" - Poncho Sanchez
"I'm Here" - Ricardo Scales
"The New Bossa Nova" - Luciana Souza

Latin Christian/Gospel Album of the Year

"Inolvidable" - Julissa
"Tu Amor" - Danilo Montero
"Gotta Have Musica Cristiana 2" - Various Artists
"Sinfonía del Alma" - Marcos Witt

People

Songwriter of the Year

Juan Luis Guerra
Anthony "Romeo" Santos
Joan Sebastian
Marco Antonio Solís

Producer of the Year

Juan Luis Guerra
Jesus Guillen
Marco Antonio Solís
Ernesto Perez Zagaste (El Chapo de Sinaloa)

Labels

Publisher of the Year

ARPA, BMI
CRISMA, ASCAP
Sony/ATV Discos, ASCAP
WB Music, ASCAP

Publishing Corporation of the Year

EMI Music
Sony/ATV Music
Universal Music
Warner/Chappell Music

Hot Latin Songs Label of the Year

EMI Televisa
Fonovisa
Sony BMG Norte
Universal Latino

Top Latin Albums Label of the Year

Machete
Sony BMG Norte
UG
Universal Latino

Latin Pop Airplay Label of the Year

EMI Televisa
Sony BMG Norte
Universal Latino
Warner Latina

Tropical Airplay Label of the Year

EMI Televisa
Machete
Sony BMG Norte
Universal Latino

Regional Mexican Airplay Label of the Year

Disa
Edimonsa
Fonovisa
Univision

Latin Rhythm Airplay Label of the Year

Machete
Sony BMG Norte
Universal Latino
Universal Motown

Latin Pop Albums Label of the Year

EMI Televisa
Sony BMG Norte
UG
Universal Latino

Tropical Albums Label of the Year

EMI Televisa
Sony BMG Norte
UG
Universal Latino

Regional Mexican Albums Label of the Year

Machete
Sony BMG Norte
UG
Universal Latino

Latin Rhythm Albums Label of the Year
IGA
Machete
UG
Universal Latino

References

Billboard Latin Music Awards
Latin Billboard Music Awards
Latin Billboard Music Awards
Billboard Music Awards
Latin Billboard Music